The 1986 Iowa Hawkeyes football team represented the University of Iowa in the 1986 NCAA Division I-A football season.

Schedule

Roster

Rankings

Game summaries

Iowa State

Source: Box Score and Game Story
    
    
    
    
    
    
    
    
    

IOWA: Hudson 20 Rush, 120 Yds
IOWA: Mauro 5 Rec, 149 Yds
The victory over Iowa State was Hayden Fry's 53rd at Iowa, making him the winningest coach in Iowa history. Jim Mauro had three receiving touchdowns and Rob Houghtlin kicked three field goals to lead the Hawks. The Hawkeye defense limited Iowa State to 125 yards of total offense.

Northern Illinois

Source: Box Score
    
    
    
    
    
    
    
    
    

Three Iowa running backs scored two touchdowns each as the Hawkeyes dominated the Huskies in this quick-moving game. For the second straight week, Iowa's opponent scored with just over a minute remaining in the game to avoid a shutout. Iowa held Northern Illinois to 159 yards of total offense.

UTEP

Source: Box Score
    
    
    
    
    
    
    
    
    
    
    

Three Hawkeyes scored two touchdowns each and the Iowa defense gave up just 150 yards in this route of UTEP.

Michigan State

Source: Box Score and Game Story

Wisconsin

Source: Box Score and Game Story
    
    
    
    
    

IOWA: Bass 22 Rush, 107 Yds

Michigan

Source: Box Score and Game Story

Northwestern

Source: Box Score and Game Story

Ohio State

Source: Box Score

Illinois

Source: Box Score and Game Story

Purdue

Source: Box Score and Game Story

Minnesota

Source: Box Score and Game Story
    
    
    
    
    
    
    
    
    
    
    

IOWA: Mauro 6 Rec, 100 Yds

Holiday Bowl

Awards and honors

Team players in the 1987 NFL Draft

References

Iowa
Iowa Hawkeyes football seasons
Holiday Bowl champion seasons
Iowa Hawkeyes football